Vladilen Nikitin (30 October 1936 – 27 May 2021) was a Russian engineer and politician. He served as first deputy premier during the Gorbachev Era.

Biography
Nikitin was born in 1936. He attended the Omsk Agricultural Institute and then the Higher Party School at the CPSU Central Committee and graduated with a degree in mechanical engineering.

Nikitin worked as senior engineer until 1976 when he was appointed chairman of the Tyumen Oblast. In 1985, he became minister of agriculture and then first deputy chairman of the state agroindustrial committee, Gosagroprom. He served as first deputy prime minister under Soviet President Mikhail Gorbachev. He was also appointed chairman of the state commission for food and purchasing, becoming the first executive of the body. He was fired by Gorbachev on 31 August 1990 due to cigarette shortage which caused demonstrations in Moscow.

He died on 27 May 2021.

References

20th-century Russian engineers
21st-century Russian engineers
1936 births
2021 deaths
Politicians from Omsk
Communist Party of the Soviet Union members
Omsk State Agrarian University alumni
People's commissars and ministers of the Soviet Union
Soviet mechanical engineers